Neftchala may refer to:
 Neftchala Rayon, Azerbaijan
 Neftçala, capital of Neftchala Rayon